Montes de Oca is a Spanish surname meaning "mountains of goose". Notable people with the surname include:

Bryce Montes de Oca (born 1996), American baseball player
Eliecer Montes de Oca (born 1971), Cuban baseball player
Fernando Montes de Oca (1829–1847), Mexican hero
Isidoro Montes de Oca (1789–1847), Mexican-Filipino revolutionary soldier
 Marco Antonio Montes de Oca (1932-2009), Mexican poet and painter
 

Spanish-language surnames